Jón Pétursson (19 July 1936) is an Icelandic athlete. He competed in the men's high jump at the 1960 Summer Olympics. He published an autobiography in 2010 titled "Jón lögga".

References

1936 births
Living people
Athletes (track and field) at the 1960 Summer Olympics
Jon Petursson
Jon Petursson